Oleksiy Chystyakov (born 3 August 1974) is a retired Ukrainian football player and current coach.

Career
Chystyakov is a product of FC Kolos Nikopol and DVUFK Dnipropetrovsk youth sportive school systems. His first trainers were Oleksandr Borovykov and Ihor Blazhevskyi (in Kolos) and Volodymyr Kobzarev (in DVUFK).

In 1992, he started his football career at FC Dynamo Luhansk, where he was invited to Zorya Lugansk in the summer of 1994. In 1995, he went to Russia, where he defended the colors of the clubs of Gekris Anapa and FC Kuban Slavyansk-na-Kubani. In September 1996, he returned to Ukraine and became a player in FC Metalurh Novomoskovsk. In the summer of 1998, he went to FC Metalurh-2 Zaporizhzhia, but by the verdict of the doctors he was forced to end his football career in the young age.

References

External links
 
 

1974 births
Living people
People from Ivanovo
Ukrainian footballers
Ukrainian football managers
Ukrainian expatriate footballers
Ukrainian Premier League players
FC Dynamo Luhansk players
Expatriate footballers in Russia
FC Zorya Luhansk players
FC Metalurh-2 Zaporizhzhia players
FC Metalurh Novomoskovsk players
FC Slavyansk Slavyansk-na-Kubani players
FC Tekstilshchik Ivanovo players
Ukrainian Premier League managers
FC Chornomorets Odesa managers
FC Zorya Luhansk managers
FC Stal Kamianske managers
Association football midfielders
FC Spartak-UGP Anapa players